The  commonly known as TUAT is a Japanese national university headquartered in Fuchū, Tokyo. This university focuses on the study of agriculture and engineering.

The undergraduate organization of the university has two faculties, Agriculture and Engineering, and several departments as shown below.

History 
The predecessor of the university was founded in 1874 as an agricultural training institute. In 1949 it was reorganized into a national university.

Organization

Undergraduate schools 
 Faculty of Agriculture 
 Department of Biological Production
 Department of Applied Biological Science
 Department of Environmental and Natural Resource Sciences
 Department of Ecoregion Science
 Cooperative Department of Veterinary Medicine
 Faculty of Engineering 
 Department of Biotechnology and Life Science
 Department of Biomedical Engineering
 Department of Applied Chemistry
 Department of Applied Physics and Chemical Engineering
 Department of Mechanical Systems Engineering
 Department of Electrical Engineering and Computer Science

Graduate schools 
(M=master course, D=three-year doctoral course, D4=four-year doctoral course, M+D=five-year doctoral course, P=professional degree course) 
 Graduate School of Agriculture
 Department of Science of Biological Production (M)
 Department of Natural Resources and Eco-materials (M)
 Department of Environmental Conservation (M)
 Department of International Environmental and Agricultural Science (M)
 Department of Sustainable and Symbiotic Society (M)
 Department of Environmental Science on Biosphere (M)
 Department of Environmental and Agricultural Engineering (M)
 Cooperative Division of Veterinary Science  (D4)
 Graduate School of Engineering
 Department of Biotechnology and Life Science (M, D)
 Department of Applied Chemistry (M, D)
 Department of Mechanical Systems Engineering (M, D)
 Department of Applied Physics (M, D)
 Department of Electrical and Electronic Engineering (M, D)
 Department of Computer and Information Sciences (M, D)
 Department of Electronic and Information Engineering (M, D)
 Department of Joint Doctoral Program for Sustainability Research  (D)
 Department of Industrial Technology and Innovation (P)
 Graduate School of Bio-Applications and Systems Engineering
 Department of Bio-Functions and Systems Science (M, D)
 Department of Food and Energy Systems Science (M+D)
 Cooperative Major of Advanced Health Science (D) 
 United Graduate School of Agricultural Science
 Department of Biological Production Science (D)
 Department of Applied Life Science (D)
 Department of Symbiotic Science of Environment and Natural Resources (D)
 Department of Agricultural and Environmental Engineering (D)
 Department of Science on Agricultural Economy and Symbiotic Society (D)
 Leading Graduate School for Green and Clean Food Production (M+D)
 TUAT WISE Program (M+D)

Research institutions 
 Institute of Agriculture
 Institute of Engineering
 Institute of Global Innovation Research

Facilities 
 Nature and Science Museum
 Animal Medical Center

Campuses 

The university has campuses at two cities in Western Tokyo, Fuchū and Koganei. Fuchu Campus has the university's head office and focuses on agriculture. Koganei Campus focuses on engineering.

Fuchu Campus 
 3-8-1 Harumi-cho, Fuchu-shi, Tokyo 183-8538, Japan (Head office)
 3-5-8 Saiwai-cho, Fuchu-shi, Tokyo 183–8509, Japan (Faculty of Agriculture and others)

Koganei Campus 
 2-24-16 Naka-cho, Koganei-shi, Tokyo 184–8588, Japan (Faculty of Engineering and others)

Facilities

Dormitories 
The university has following dormitories in the campuses.
 Fuchu Campus
 Fuchu International House: For international students, visiting researchers and professors (men and women) 
 : For domestic and international students (men and women) 
 : For domestic and international students (women) 
 Koganei Campus
 Koganei International House: For international students, visiting researchers and professors (men and women) 
 : For domestic and international students (men) 
 : For domestic students (women) 
International students can also apply for Hitotsubashi University's International Student House in Kodaira City.

Data (people) 
The university has about 4,200 undergraduate students and 1,800 graduate students, including more than 400 international students. Every year, around 140 fellows complete doctoral (PhD) degrees. The university has a full-time faculty of 442, plus 377 part-time faculty.

Recognitions
(2018) With 400+ academic-staffs, TUAT is Japan's second "most-productive" university in terms of "Number of papers per academic-staff" (QS Asian University ranking 2018) 
(2018) Ranked as the top 1% of universities in Asia (QS Asian University Ranking 2018). 
(2012) The world first: Building a plant factory for fruits: Advanced Plant Factory
(2011) Royalty income from patents was the highest among Japanese universities.
(2007) Ranked #1st Paper Citation Index (Field of Engineering, by Asahi Newspaper/University Ranking 2007 and the ISI-Thomson database)
(2005) Grants per one faculty in joint research with industry was the highest among Japanese universities.

NOTE: The evaluation for the ranking system (from UK-based or Shanghai-based, etc.) is identical for all Universities of the same category and provides a clear and just ranking, taking into consideration the location and the size of the university.

Distinguished alumni
 Akira Endo, 2006 Japan Prize laureate, 2008 Lasker-DeBakey Clinical Medical Research Award, the Canada Gairdner International Award 2017. Professor, 1979–1997. Research into the relationship between fungi and cholesterol biosynthesis led to the development of statin drugs, which are some of the best-selling pharmaceuticals in history.
 Susumu Ohno, Author of "Evolution by gene duplication". Ph.D. in Veterinary Science in 1949.
 Hirohide Hamashima, Director of Bridgestone's Motorsport Tyre Development. Master course 1977.
 Taro Kato, President (CEO) of NGK Insulators, Bachelor of Engineering, 1972.
 Shigeru Uehara, Development chief of Honda NSX, Bachelor of Engineering, 1971.
 Masaru Gomi, President/CEO of TOYO Corporation, Bachelor of Engineering.
 Morshed Khan, (1940–) Foreign minister of Bangladesh (2001–2006). Bachelor of Engineering.
 Ginandjar Kartasasmita, (1941–) Former Minister of National Development Planning, Minister of Mines and Energy,  Coordinating Minister for Economic Affairs (1998-1999), Member of Indonesian Presidential Advisory Council (2010–2014), 1st Speaker of Indonesia Regional Representative Council (2004–2009); Japan's Grand Cordon of the Order of the Rising Sun 旭日大綬章 2008. Dr. Honoris Causa from TUAT (2005). Bachelor of Engineering 1965.

Footnotes

References

External links
 Tokyo University of Agriculture and Technology, retrieved November 16, 2016
 Tokyo University of Agriculture and Technology, retrieved September 6, 2007
 Tokyo University of Agriculture and Technology, 2010 version
 , 2023 version.
 World University Rankings, 2012.
 Ranking Web of World Universities, 2012.
 Tokyo University of Agriculture and Technology

 
Forestry education
Japanese national universities
Western Tokyo
Fuchū, Tokyo
Koganei, Tokyo
1949 establishments in Japan
Educational institutions established in 1949
Universities and colleges in Tokyo